Humberto Cabrera (born 25 March 1954) is a Cuban former sports shooter. He competed in the 50 metre rifle, prone event at the 1972 Summer Olympics.

References

1954 births
Living people
Cuban male sport shooters
Olympic shooters of Cuba
Shooters at the 1972 Summer Olympics
Place of birth missing (living people)
20th-century Cuban people